is a railway station in Yoshinogari, Kanzaki District, Saga Prefecture, Japan. It is operated by JR Kyushu and is on the Nagasaki Main Line.

Lines

Station layout 
The station consists of a side and an island platform serving three tracks with two sidings branching off track 1. The station building is a modern design of concrete and is a hashigami structure where the passenger facilities such as a waiting area, ticket window and automatic ticket vending machines are located on a bridge which spans the tracks. The bridge also allows the station to have two entrances, one from each side of the tracks. Elevators provide access to the bridge from both entrances and, from the bridge, to the platforms.

Management of the station has been outsourced to the JR Kyushu Tetsudou Eigyou Co., a wholly owned subsidiary of JR Kyushu specialising in station services. It staffs the ticket window which is equipped with a POS machine but does not have a Midori no Madoguchi facility.

Adjacent stations

Environs
Yoshinogari Historical Park
National Route 34

History
On 1 December 1943, the facility was upgraded to a full station and passenger traffic commenced. With the privatization of Japanese National Railways (JNR), the successor of JGR, on 1 April 1987, control of the station passed to JR Kyushu. On 10 October 1993, the station was renamed Yoshinogari-Kōen. On 1 March 2000, a new hashigami style station building was opened.

Passenger statistics
In fiscal 2016, the station was used by an average of 1,333 passengers daily (boarding passengers only), and it ranked 133rd  among the busiest stations of JR Kyushu.

References

External links
Yoshinogari-Kōen Station (JR Kyushu)

Railway stations in Saga Prefecture
Railway stations in Japan opened in 1943